Nalini "Deedee" Cheriel is a visual artist, musician and filmmaker who lives in Los Angeles, California.

Career 
From the age of 19, Cheriel started out creating record covers and T-shirts for the Oregon music scene. She was a member of the band Adickdid, which was distributed by several labels including Yoyo Records and Kill Rock Stars. She also played in the bands Juned, Teen Angels, and The Hindi Guns.

In 2001, Cheriel, along with friends Kurt Voss and Zoe Poledouris, created the film Down and Out With the Dolls. This film is loosely based on Cheriel's life as a musician and the stories she would tell Voss about this time of her life. After this film was released, Cheriel moved to Los Angeles, California where she lives still.

After moving to Los Angeles, Cheriel began work as a visual artist. She has created several paintings which continue on the themes she explored in her music, as well as exploring new ones. The main theme of her art, according to Cheriel, would be the attempts of people to connect to the world around them and to each other. Cheriel's interest in the relationship between man and our natural surroundings is apparent from the abundance of animals in her paintings. Cheriel uses these animals to depict human emotions.

Exhibition record

2013
Episodes in the Abundant Oasis Merry Karnowsky Gallery (Los Angeles) July 2013
McCaig Welles Gallery  (New York) June 2013
Moniker Art Fair (London) October 2013
Little Spirit and Infinite Longing, Pure Evil Gallery (London) March 2010

2012
AIko, Tara McPherson & Deedee Cheriel: Merry Karnowsky Gallery (Los Angeles) February 2012
Just Passing Through (Amsterdam, ND) September 2012
Busy Being  (Austin, TX) March 2012
University Of Milwaukee (Milwaukee, WI) February 2012
Street Art Show LA ARTS  (Los Angeles) April 2012
Unnatural History  (Bristol UK) July 2012
Unnatural History (Melbourne, AU) April 2012

2011
Modern Fabulist View Gallery (Bristol, UK) April 2011
FemkeHiemstra, Audrey Kawasaki & Deedee Cheriel: Merry Karnowsky Gallery (Los Angeles) July 2011

2010
Abracaabra Merry Karnowsky Gallery (Los Angeles) October 2010
Art Basel Art Fair  McCaig Welles Gallery  (Miami) December 2010
SUBject/ SubJECT Subliminal Projects (Los Angeles) May 2010
Amsterdam Art Fair:  Mauger Modern (London) March 2010

2009
True Self: Jonathan LeVine Gallery (New York) October 2009
Beyond Eden: Subliminal Projects (Los Angeles)  September 2009
Lovable Like Orphaned Kitties and Bastard Children: Green Gallery (Milwaukee, WI) May 2009
Together We Are: Barracuda (Los Angeles) July 2009
Sunset Junction: LA ART (Los Angeles) August 2009
Lovable Like Orphan Kitties and Bastard Children: Green Gallery (Milwaukee, WI) 
Print Heavy: NOMAD Gallery (Los Angeles) 
Lovable Like Orphan Kitties and Bastard Children: LACE Gallery (Los Angeles) 
Harmonious Glory: Mei Xue Gallery (Los Angeles/ Beijing)

2008
Deedee Cheriel and Louise Bonnet: Subliminal Projects  (Los Angeles) May 2008
TBD White Walls Gallery (San Francisco) December 2008
Cologne Art Fair: McCaig-Welles Gallery October 2008
Look!: Jail Gallery (Los Angeles) August 2008
Deedee Cheriel  Recent Works : Stitch Gallery (Tokyo, Japan) December 2008
New Works: Welles-Rosenthal Gallery  (Redwood City) June 2008

2007
Bridge Art Fair: Art Basel (Miami)
Into the Stars and Always Up: McCaig Welles Gallery  (Brooklyn)
Tiger in a Tropical Storm: Riviera Gallery  (Brooklyn)
Tall Totem Pole: Gallery 1269  (Los Angeles)
Fountain Art Fair: McCaig Welles Gallery  (New York)
Bridge Art Fair: Mc Caig Welles (Chicago)
The Girls Room: Jen Bekman Gallery  (New York)
Jail Weddings: Jail Gallery (Los Angeles)

2005-2006
Pop, Bang, Slide: Autopsy Gallery  (Melbourne, Australia)
5ives: Receiver Gallery  (San Francisco)
Market Show: Stall 54   (London)
Free words: Free Biennial  (New York)               
The Group Show: David Allen Gallery  (New York)
 2 Artists: FLUXCO Gallery  (Los Angeles)
Sunset and St. Marks: Capla-Kesting Fine Art  (New York)
Sunset and St. Marks: Capla-Kesting Fine Art  (Los Angeles)
Bridge Art Fair: Art Basel  (Miami)
1st and Hope: Brian Lotti Space  (Los Angeles)

2000-2004
Street / School Girls: New Image Art Gallery  (Los Angeles)
Hollywood Bowl: Track 16 Gallery  (Los Angeles – with Kenny Scharf and Ed Moses)
ArtPolitix: ArtSpace  (Los Angeles)
Street notes: Blue Box  (London)               
Salon Du Petit: Gallery 825  (Los Angeles)
Small Creatures: Dirt Gallery  (Los Angeles)
Ms. Understood: Planet 24 Gallery  (Portland)

References 

Year of birth missing (living people)
Living people
American women rock singers
American punk rock musicians
Feminist musicians
Riot grrrl musicians
Musicians from Eugene, Oregon
21st-century American women
Women punk rock singers